Nilavareh may refer to:
 Nilavareh-ye Olya
 Nilavareh-ye Sofla